Already Restless is the second and final studio album by Canadian country music trio Prescott-Brown. It was released by Columbia Records in 1994. The album peaked at number 10 on the RPM Country Albums chart in Canada.

Track listing

Personnel
 Tom Burroughs - electric guitar
 Joe Chemay - bass
 Jerry Douglas - resonator guitar
 Dan Dugmore - electric guitar, steel guitar, slide guitar
 John Dymond - bass
 Carl Gorodetzky - violin
 John Jorgenson - electric guitar
 Paul Leim - drums
 Bob Mason - cello
 Brent Mason - electric guitar
 The Nashville String Machine - strings
 Steve Nathan - keyboards
 Steve O'Connor - keyboards
 Jon Park-Wheeler - electric guitar, acoustic guitar
 Ken Post - drums
 Harry Stinson - drums, vocals
 Gary Vanosdale - viola
 Biff Watson - acoustic guitar
 Kris Wilkinson - viola
 Paul Worley - electric guitar, acoustic guitar
 Barry Brown - vocals, acoustic guitar 
 Randall Prescott - vocals, mandolin, harp
 Tracey Prescott - vocals

Chart performance

References

1994 albums
Prescott-Brown albums
Columbia Records albums